Jamil J James (born 16 September 1986) is a sprinter from Trinidad and Tobago who specializes in the 400 metres.  His father, Trevor J James, is a former Olympic sprinter who represented Trinidad and Tobago in the 1972 Munich Olympics.



Career

He attended the University of South Carolina - Columbia from 2004 to 2008. His personal best time is 46.68 seconds (400m), achieved in June 2003 in Port-of-Spain, Trinidad

Achievements

External links

1986 births
Living people
Trinidad and Tobago male sprinters
Central American and Caribbean Games silver medalists for Trinidad and Tobago
Competitors at the 2006 Central American and Caribbean Games
Central American and Caribbean Games medalists in athletics
Athletes (track and field) at the 2003 Pan American Games
Pan American Games competitors for Trinidad and Tobago